Abu al-Duhur Military Airbase (sometimes spelled Abu ad-Duhur) is a major airbase of the Syrian Arab Air Force. The airbase is located about 5 km east of Abu al-Duhur, in Idlib Governorate.

Syrian Civil War
During the Syrian Civil War, rebel groups had taken control of significant territory within the vicinity of Abu al-Duhur Airbase beginning in 2012. After surrounding the airbase for nearly three years, and killing at least 56 government soldiers in an early morning attack, the al-Nusra Front took control of the airbase in September 2015. A video showed a number of out-of-service fighter jets for several years  mostly pulled to the side of the aprons and rocket launchers. On 10 January 2018, the Syrian army and allies recaptured the air base. Over the course of the Syrian Civil War, the airbase was completely destroyed and rendered useless.

See also
 List of Syrian Air Force bases
 Siege of Abu al-Duhur Airbase

References 

Syrian Air Force bases